Kevin Edward Dwyer (19 July 1913 – 22 August 1982) was an Australian politician and a Labor member of the New South Wales Legislative Assembly for 7 months in 1949–50.

Early life
Dwyer was born in Goondiwindi, Queensland and was the son of a timberworker. He was educated at Christian Brothers' High School, Lewisham and in an example of nominative determinism became a dyer.  Dwyer was elected as an alderman of Alexandria Municipal Council in 1947 and was its last mayor, prior to its integration into the City of Sydney in 1948. He continued as an alderman of the city of Sydney between 1948 and 1959 and was the Deputy Lord Mayor in 1958. Following his retirement from parliament he started a second hand timber yard and was a clerk with the Sydney County Council, the electricity supply authority for Sydney. He was a cousin of Rex Connor, a former member of the Legislative Assembly and a minister in the government of Gough Whitlam.

Political career
Dwyer was  elected to parliament as the Labor member for Redfern at the October 1949 by-election caused by the death of the incumbent Labor member George Noble. His only opponent was Merv Pidcock of the Communist Party of Australia and he won 91.2% of the vote. However, he lost the Labor pre-selection ballot for the 1950 state election to Fred Green and he subsequently retired from state politics when that election was held in May 1950.

References

 

1913 births
1982 deaths
Members of the New South Wales Legislative Assembly
Australian Labor Party members of the Parliament of New South Wales
20th-century Australian politicians
Mayors of Alexandria, New South Wales
Deputy Lord Mayors of Sydney
Sydney City Councillors